Beall  is a surname. Notable people with the surname include:

Bob Beall (born 1948), American baseball player
Daryl Beall (born 1946), American politician
George Beall (born 1729), landowner whose partial holdings were ceded to establish Georgetown in Washington, D.C.
George Beall (attorney) (1937–2017), prosecutor who brought down U.S. Vice President Spiro Agnew
James Andrew Beall (1866–1929), American politician, represented Texas in the U.S. House of Representatives, 1903 to 1915
James Glenn Beall (1894–1971), U.S. Senator from Maryland
Jim Beall (California politician) (born 1952), American politician
Jeffrey Beall, American librarian
J. Glenn Beall Jr. (1927–2006), U.S. Senator from Maryland
Jo Beall (born 1952), British academic specialising in development studies and economic development
John Yates Beall (1835–1865), Confederate privateer and spy
Johnny Beall (1882–1926), American baseball player
Lester Beall (1903–1969), American graphic designer
Lloyd J. Beall (1808–1887), American military officer and paymaster of U.S. Army, Commandant of the Confederate States Marine Corps
Martha Beall Mitchell (1918–1976), American wife of John Mitchell, U.S. Attorney General under President Richard Nixon
Mary Stevens Beall (1854–1917), American historian, writer, librarian
Rezin Beall (1723–1809), American Revolutionary war General from Maryland
Reasin Beall (1769–1843), Ohio congressman and militia general during War of 1812
Samuel Beall (1807–1868), American politician, second Lieutenant Governor of Wisconsin
Walter Beall (1899–1959), American baseball player
William Beall (1825–1883), brigadier general in the Confederate States Army

See also
Beall Island, Antarctica
Beall Woods State Park, Wabash County, Illinois, U.S.
Beallsville, Pennsylvania, borough in Washington County, Pennsylvania, U.S.
Bealls (Florida) (pronounced belz), Florida-based department store chain founded by Robert M. Beall
Bealls (Texas) (pronounced belz), Texas-based department store chain founded by brothers Archie and Robbie Beall, later included brother, Willie Beall
Beall High School (pronounced bel), was a public high school in Frostburg, Maryland
Beal (disambiguation)
Beale (disambiguation)
Beel (disambiguation)
Bheel (disambiguation)
Bil (disambiguation)